Lucas Acosta  may refer to:

 Lucas Acosta (footballer, born 1988), Argentine currently playing for Racing Club de Montevideo
 Lucas Acosta (footballer, born 1995), currently playing for Club Atlético Sarmiento